Lieutenant General Rob Zuiderwijk (born January 13, 1951) is a retired Royal Netherlands Navy officer who is a former Commander of the Royal Netherlands Navy and Admiral Benelux.

High command 
Zuiderwijk succeeded Brigadier General Willem Prins in 4 juli 2001 as commander of the Dutch naval forces in the Caribbean. After getting promoted to Major General in 2004, he became commander of the Royal Netherlands Marine Corps. In 2007 Zuiderwijk was again promoted, this time to Lieutenant General as he became Commander of the Royal Netherlands Navy. In 2010 he was succeeded by Vice Admiral Matthieu Borsboom.

References

External links 
 

1951 births
Living people
Commanders of the Royal Netherlands Navy
Royal Netherlands Marine Corps generals
Royal Netherlands Navy personnel
Military personnel from The Hague